Vanessa hippomene, commonly known as the southern short-tailed admiral, is a butterfly of the family Nymphalidae which is native to South Africa and Madagascar.

Wingspan is 45–45 mm in males and 42–48 mm in females. Has two or three flight periods with peak between April and May.

The larvae feed on Fleurya capensis, Laportia peduncularis, Pouzolia parasitica, Didymodoxa caffra and Urtica species.

This species was traditionally considered to be a member of the genus Antanartia, but recent molecular analyses reveals that it is more closely related to members of the genus Vanessa.

Subspecies
V. h. hippomene — Eswatini and South Africa: KwaZulu-Natal, Eastern Cape and southeastern Western Cape
V. h. madegassorum (Aurivillius, 1899) — Madagascar: plateau

References

Butterflies described in 1823
hippomene
Taxa named by Jacob Hübner